This is the list of mobile phone brands sorted by the country from which the brands originate.

Defunct

No longer associated with mobile phones

References

 
Country
 Brands
 Brands
Mobile phone
Mobile phones
Mobile phone brands
Mobile phone brands